The 1972 Villanova Wildcats football team represented the Villanova University during the 1972 NCAA University Division football season. The head coach was Lou Ferry, coaching his third season with the Wildcats. The team played their home games at Villanova Stadium in Villanova, Pennsylvania.

Schedule

Roster

References

External Links

1972 Villanova - Cincinnati Football Game Film

Villanova
Villanova Wildcats football seasons
Villanova Wildcats football